Gino Brousseau (born September 4, 1966) is a former Canadian volleyball player, a member of Canada men's national volleyball team from 1984 to 2000, and a participant in the 1992 Olympic Games. He is the current head coach of Laval Rouge et Or men's volleyball team and the Canada men's junior national volleyball team.

Personal life
Brousseau was born in Quebec City, Quebec. He went to the Université Laval for five years, being names student-athlete of the year in both 1988 and 1990.

References

External links 
 

1966 births
Living people
Canadian men's volleyball players
French Quebecers
Laval Rouge et Or athletes
Olympic volleyball players of Canada
Volleyball players at the 1992 Summer Olympics